In mathematics, an algebra homomorphism is a homomorphism between two  algebras.

 
 
 

The first two conditions say that  is a K-linear map (or K-module homomorphism if K is a ring), and the last condition says that  preserves the algebra multiplication. So, if the algebras are associative,  is a rng homomorphism, and, if the algebras are rings and  preserves the identity, it is a ring homomorphism.

Unital algebra homomorphisms 

If A and B are two unital algebras, then an algebra homomorphism  is said to be unital if it maps the unity of A to the unity of B. Often the words "algebra homomorphism" are actually used to mean "unital algebra homomorphism", in which case non-unital algebra homomorphisms are excluded.

A unital algebra homomorphism is a (unital) ring homomorphism.

Examples
 Every ring is a -algebra since there always exists a unique homomorphism . See Associative algebra#Examples for the explanation.
 Any homomorphism of commutative rings  gives  the structure of a commutative -algebra. Conversely, if  is a commutative -algebra, the map  is a homomorphism of commutative rings.
 If A is a subalgebra of B, then for every invertible b in B the function that takes every a in A to b−1 a b is an algebra homomorphism (in case , this is called an inner automorphism of B).  If A is also simple and B is a central simple algebra, then every homomorphism from A to B is given in this way by some b in B; this is the Skolem–Noether theorem.

See also 
Morphism

Spectrum of a ring
Augmentation (algebra)

References

Algebras
Ring theory
Morphisms